Anna Shechtman (born 1990/1991) is an American journalist and crossword compiler. Shechtman is film editor for the Los Angeles Review of Books, and compiles crossword puzzles for The New Yorker and The New York Times.

Early life
Shechtman grew up in a Jewish family in New York City's Tribeca neighborhood. She earned a bachelor's degree from Swarthmore College, and in 2020 received a PhD in English Literature and Film & Media Studies at Yale University.

Crosswords
Shechtman was 19 when her first crossword appeared in the New York Times. Until she was 25, she created most of her puzzles by hand using graph paper and dictionaries rather than crossword software. Shechtman is the second youngest female crossword creator to be published in the New York Times. After graduating college, Will Shortz asked Schechtman to be his assistant at the New York Times.

In May 2019, The Guardian called her "the new queen of crosswords".

She has been praised for including youthful references and lighthearted clues such as "'state of being awesome, in modern slang' (answer: epicness)."

References

Living people
The New York Times writers
The New Yorker people
Crossword compilers
Swarthmore College alumni
1990s births